Rev. Henry White (1833 – 7 October 1890, London) was a priest of the Church of England and the chaplain of the Queen's Chapel of the Savoy.

After education at King's College London and Worcester College, Oxford, Henry White was ordained deacon in 1859 and priest in 1860 by the then Archbishop of Canterbury John Bird Sumner. White's first curacy was at Dover, but in 1860 Queen Victoria appointed him to the chaplaincy of the Chapel Royal, Savoy, where he ministered until his death at age 56. He was appointed Hon. Chaplain-in-Ordinary to the Queen in 1870 and Chaplain-in-Ordinary to the Queen in 1873. From 1869 to 1874 White was Chaplain to the House of Commons and was reappointed in 1889.

On Sunday 11 October 1891 the Henry White Memorial Window by Clayton and Bell was unveiled at the Royal Chapel, Savoy.

References

1833 births
1890 deaths
Alumni of Worcester College, Oxford
19th-century English Anglican priests
Chaplains of the House of Commons (UK)